Tony Valente Pereira (born October 11, 1984) is a French comic artist. After being inspired by works of various other comic artists, Valente began illustrating The Four Princes of Ganahan in 2004. Following its completion, he worked with Didier Tarquin on S.P.E.E.D. Angels. After it ended in 2013, Valente began working on Radiant, which has received critical acclaim and an anime adaptation in 2018.

Biography
Tony Valente was born in Toulouse on October 11, 1984. As a teenager, Valente was a fan of Akira Toriyama's Dragon Ball, as well as various works by Didier Tarquin. One year after its completion, Valente launched his first solo project, Hana Attori. After its completion, he did illustrations for Didier Tarquin's .

Following its completion, Valente began working on Radiant and eventually released its first volume in 2013. It performed very well commercially, especially in Japan. In 2015, thanks to help from manga artists Yusuke Murata and Hiro Mashima, Radiant became the first French comic to be published in the country. In October 2018, the series received an anime adaptation produced by Lerche. The series has also been acclaimed by critics, and received the /J'aime lire comic award in 2015. It also received the Daruma for Best international manga at Japan Expo 2016.

Works
  (2004–2007, story by )
 Hana Attori (2008–2010)
  (2012–2013, story by Didier Tarquin)
 Radiant (2013–present)

References

External links
  
 

1984 births
Artists from Toulouse
French cartoonists
French comics artists
French comics writers
Living people
French people of Portuguese descent